Henry Owen Lewis (26 September 1842 - 5 August 1913) was an Irish Home Rule politician. He was MP for Carlow Borough from 1874 to 1880. His daughter Frances (1873–1959) married colonial governor Cornelius Alfred Moloney and in widowhood co-founded the Missionary Sisters of St. Columban.

He was High Sheriff of Monaghan in 1885. He died 4 August 1913 at Manresa House, Roehampton, and was buried at St Mary Magdalen Roman Catholic Church, Mortlake.

References

External links
 

1842 births
1913 deaths
Members of the Parliament of the United Kingdom for County Carlow constituencies (1801–1922)
UK MPs 1874–1880
High Sheriffs of Monaghan
Home Rule League MPs
Burials at St Mary Magdalen Roman Catholic Church Mortlake